Diego Gabriel Rosa Lambach (born 27 August 1998) is a Uruguayan footballer who plays as a midfielder for Uruguay Montevideo in the Uruguayan Primera División.

Career statistics

Club

References

External links

1998 births
Living people
Rampla Juniors players
Uruguayan Primera División players
Uruguayan footballers
Association football midfielders
Uruguayan Segunda División players